David Crosbie may refer to:

David Crosbie (Brookside), a character on the Channel 4 soap opera titled Brookside
David Crosbie, prisoner on the St. Michael of Scarborough

See also
David Crosby (disambiguation)